Sanne Chatarina Johanna Lennström (née Eriksson; born 1988) is a Swedish politician and member of the Riksdag, the national legislature. A member of the Social Democratic Party, she has represented Uppsala County since September 2018. She had previously been a substitute member of the Riksdag for Ardalan Shekarabi twice: October 2014 to April 2017; and January 2018 to September 2018.

Lennström is the daughter of metalworker and regional politician Thomas Eriksson and housing manager Monica Bonde Eriksson. She trained to be a teacher at Uppsala University. She has been a member of the municipal council in Östhammar Municipality since 2018.

References

1988 births
Living people
Members of the Riksdag 2018–2022
Members of the Riksdag 2022–2026
Members of the Riksdag from the Social Democrats
People from Östhammar Municipality
Women members of the Riksdag
21st-century Swedish women politicians